Desley Ubbink (born 15 June 1993) is a Dutch professional footballer who plays as a midfielder for Romanian club UTA Arad.

Career

Club
In February 2014, Ubbink signed a three-year contract with Kazakhstan Premier League side FC Taraz. Halfway through his Taraz contract, Ubbink moved to fellow Kazakhstan Premier League side FC Shakhter Karagandy.

On 29 November 2016, Ubbink signed a three-year contract with Fortuna liga club AS Trenčín, to start from the clubs winter break. On 30 July 2019 he was released from his contract.

On 25 November 2019, he joined Polish side Podbeskidzie.

Personal life
On 5 October 2015, Ubbink was sentenced to 160 hours of community service, for abuse of a 14-year-old girl.

References

External links
 

1993 births
Living people
Sportspeople from Roosendaal
Dutch footballers
Dutch expatriate footballers
Association football midfielders
RKC Waalwijk players
FC Shakhter Karagandy players
FC Taraz players
AS Trenčín players
Podbeskidzie Bielsko-Biała players
FC UTA Arad players
Kazakhstan Premier League players
Slovak Super Liga players
I liga players
Liga I players
Dutch expatriate sportspeople in Kazakhstan
Dutch expatriate sportspeople in Slovakia
Dutch expatriate sportspeople in Poland
Dutch expatriate sportspeople in Romania
Expatriate footballers in Kazakhstan
Expatriate footballers in Slovakia
Expatriate footballers in Poland
Expatriate footballers in Romania
Footballers from North Brabant